Ahmet Berat Çonkar ( born 13 August 1976, Ankara , Turkey ) is a Turkish politician for the Justice and Development Party in Turkey and Deputy of Istanbul

References 

Living people
1976 births

Turkish political people